Go With the Flow is an album by American violinist and composer Michael White's Magic Music Company featuring performances recorded in 1974 and released on the Impulse! label.

Track listing
All compositions by Michael White
 "Go With the Flow #1" - 10:04   
 "The Lady Sirro" - 2:12   
 "In The Silence (Listen)" - 6:44   
 "Spaceslide" - 4:34   
 "Her" - 6:17   
 "Moondust Shuffle" - 5:01   
 "Go With the Flow #2" - 5:32

Personnel
Michael White - electric violin, tambourine, ashtray synthesizer, percussion
Ed Kelly - piano, electric piano, organ
Bob King - guitar
Kenneth Jenkins - bass, electric bass, wah-wah pedal
Paul Smith - drums
Kenneth Nash - congas, griot bells, thumb piano, vocals, gong, synthesizer, bells, percussion

References

Impulse! Records albums
Michael White (violinist) albums
1974 albums